Lígia Costa Maia da Silva (born 14 March 1996) is a Brazilian handballer for US Altkirch, France and the Brazilian national team.

Achievements
Polish Superleague:
Silver Medalist: 2016
Polish Cup:
Silver Medalist: 2016

References

1996 births
Living people
Brazilian female handball players
Sportspeople from Rio de Janeiro (city)
Expatriate handball players in Poland
Brazilian expatriate sportspeople in Poland
Brazilian expatriate sportspeople in Spain
Handball players at the 2014 Summer Youth Olympics
21st-century Brazilian women